Coffee rock is the common name for the rock-like formations of indurated sands that were formed from ancient river sediments of the Pleistocene age.

Coffee rock has been exposed by coastal weathering process on the beaches of Broadwater and Bundjalung National Parks in New South Wales, Australia. In addition, exposures can be seen in North Queensland, Australia at Kurrimine Beach, and in South East Queensland on K'gari and at the entry to Coonowrin Lake, Caloundra.

Exposed Coffee Rock on the beaches K'gari is more likely the beds of old lakes in the sand dunes when the sea level was lower. In places it is peat-like and embedded with wood ranging from small twigs to large tree trunks up to 1200mm in diameter, with some evidence of fire on the wood before being assembled.

References
 National Parks and Wildlife Service NSW: Broadwater National Park, Bundjalung National Park and Iluka Nature Reserve - Plan of Management. Sydney, August 1997. 

Sandstone in Australia
Geology of Queensland
Pleistocene